In organic chemistry, thioacyl chloride is a functional group of the type RC(S)Cl, where R is an organic substituent.  Thioacyl chlorides are analogous to acid chlorides, but much rarer and less robust.  The best studied is thiobenzoyl chloride, a purple oil first prepared by chlorination of dithiobenzoic acid with a combination of chlorine and thionyl chloride.
A more modern preparation employs phosgene as the chlorinating agent, this also generates carbonyl sulfide as a by-product.

PhCS2H + COCl2 → PhC(S)Cl + HCl + COS
The most common thioacyl chloride is thiophosgene.

References

Acyl chlorides
Functional groups
Organosulfur compounds